Salzman is a German surname meaning "salt-man". It may also appear as Salzmann or Saltzman. Notable people with this surname include:

Salzman
 Eric Salzman, American musicologist and composer
 J. R. Salzman, champion logroller and Iraq War veteran
 Linda Salzman Sagan, American artist and writer
 Louis Francis Salzman, historian
 Lorna Salzman, American environmental activist, writer, lecturer, and organizer
 Mark Salzman (born 1959), American writer
 Michele R. Salzman (born 1952), American historian
 Pnina Salzman, Israeli prize-winning pianist
 Peter J. Salzman, hacker
 Marian Salzman, American businesswoman
 Nancy Salzman, American co-founder of NXIVM cult

Salzmann
 Christian Gotthilf Salzmann (1744–1811), priest and educationalist
 Jodok Salzmann, Austrian cyclist
 Joseph Salzmann, priest, rector of Saint Francis de Sales Seminary (1819–1874)
 Felix Salten (1869–1945), Austrian writer, born Siegmund Salzmann

Saltzman
 Arnold A. Saltzman (1916–2014), American businessman, diplomat, art collector, and philanthropist
 Harry Saltzman (1915–1994), Canadian theater- and film-producer
 Linda Saltzman (1949–2005), American public health researcher
 Murray Saltzman, American Reform rabbi and civil rights leader
 Paul Saltzman, film director-producer and author
 Percy Saltzman, Canadian TV meteorologist
 W. Mark Saltzman, biomedical engineer

See also
 Max Saltsman